Barra de São Francisco is a municipality located in the Brazilian state of Espírito Santo. Its population was 44,979 (2020) and its area is 945 km².

References

Municipalities in Espírito Santo